Swann in Love (French: Un amour de Swann) is a section from the novel sequence In Search of Lost Time by the French writer Marcel Proust. The narrative is part of Swann's Way, the first volume of In Search of Lost Time.

Un amour de Swann is about the love affair between Charles Swann and Odette. The story is largely self-contained and is of novella length. For these reasons, various publishers have printed Un amour de Swann as a stand-alone volume.

Recent English translations include those by Brian Nelson (2017) and Lucy Raitz (2022).

References

In Search of Lost Time